Amphianthus is a genus of sea anemones. It is the only genus in the monotypic family Amphianthidae.

Species 
The following species are recognized:

 Amphianthus armatus Carlgren, 1928
 Amphianthus bathybium Hertwig, 1882
 Amphianthus brunneus (Pax, 1909)
 Amphianthus californicus Carlgren, 1936
 Amphianthus capensis Carlgren, 1928
 Amphianthus caribaeus (Verrill, 1899)
 Amphianthus dohrnii (Koch, 1878)
 Amphianthus ingolfi Carlgren, 1942
 Amphianthus islandicus Carlgren, 1942
 Amphianthus lacteus (Mc Murrich, 1893)
 Amphianthus laevis Carlgren, 1938
 Amphianthus margaritaceus (Danielssen, 1890)
 Amphianthus michaelsarsi Carlgren, 1934
 Amphianthus minutus (Hertwig, 1882)
 Amphianthus mirabilis (Verrill, 1879)
 Amphianthus mopseae (Danielssen, 1890)
 Amphianthus natalensis Carlgren, 1938
 Amphianthus nitidus (Verrill, 1899)
 Amphianthus norvegicus Carlgren, 1942
 Amphianthus radiatus Carlgren, 1928
 Amphianthus rosaceus Wassilieff, 1908
 Amphianthus sanctaehelenae Carlgren, 1941
 Amphianthus valdiviae Carlgren, 1928
 Amphianthus verruculatus Carlgren, 1942

References

Amphianthidae
Hexacorallia genera